"Jag Ghoomeya" (English: Toured the world) is a Punjabi song from the soundtrack of 2016 Indian film Sultan. The song is written by Irshad Kamil, composed by Vishal–Shekhar and sung by Rahat Fateh Ali Khan. It is picturised upon Salman Khan and Anushka Sharma for the film. The song also has an audio version by Salman Khan, and a female version by Neha Bhasin picturised upon Anushka Sharma.

Critical reception
"Filmbeat" described the song as melodic.

"Zee News" in its review wrote,
Soothing like a spring breeze, the lilting track will immerse deep down in you.
A romantic and gripping number, expresses the on-screen character 'Sultan Ali Khan' (Salman's) feelings for 'Aarfa' (Anushka).

"Pinkvilla" wrote the song Jag Ghoomeya is mesmerising.

Awards
Neha Bhasin was awarded the "Best female singer award" at the Filmfare Awards 2017.

References

External links

2016 songs
Songs with music by Vishal–Shekhar
Songs with lyrics by Irshad Kamil
Hindi film songs